We the Best is the second studio album by Miami-based DJ and Terror Squad member DJ Khaled. It was released on June 12, 2007, by Terror Squad Entertainment, distributed by Koch Records. DJ Khaled alongside fellow rapper Fat Joe and collectively handled as the executive producers on this album. The album was produced by The Runners, Drumma Boy, Cool & Dre, J.U.S.T.I.C.E. League, The Diaz Brothers and Jim Jonsin; as well as the guest appearances from Bone Thugs-n-Harmony, Trina, Paul Wall and Bun B, among others.

We the Best received a mixed reception from critics, who found some of the tracks enjoyable and engaging, but felt it was over-bloated with lesser tracks and Khaled's persistent ad-libbing throughout the album. The record debuted at number eight on the US Billboard 200. As of January 2008, the album has sold 440,000 copies in the United States. It was supported by two singles: "We Takin' Over" featuring T.I., Akon, Rick Ross, Fat Joe, Birdman and Lil Wayne, and the other Rick Ross-featured track "I'm So Hood" alongside T-Pain, Trick Daddy and Plies.

Singles 
The album's first single, "We Takin' Over" was released on April 1, 2007. The song features guest vocals from American rappers T.I., Rick Ross, Fat Joe, Birdman and Lil Wayne, alongside the musician Akon. The song was produced by Danja.

The album's second single, "I'm So Hood" was released on August 28, 2007. The song features guests vocals from American recording artist T-Pain, alongside rappers Trick Daddy, Plies and Rick Ross; whom recently featured on the track "We Takin' Over". The song was produced by the production duo The Runners.

A promotional single featuring two of the album's tracks, "I'm From The Ghetto" and "Brown Paper Bag", was released sometime in 2007.

Reception

Critical reception

We the Best received a generally mixed reception from music critics. Steve 'Flash' Juon of RapReviews praised the album for showcasing great lyricism and production from some of the best rappers and producers working at the time but found Khaled's repeated trademark phrases annoying, concluding with: "Other than that though this album is good - hell it's even summer banger ride in your Jeep with it 'til October good. Just don't fool yourself into thinking that Khaled had anything to do with it other than putting the right people together in the right place at the right time." Rolling Stones Christian Hoard said that Khaled's beats weren't anything innovative but were used well thanks to a huge list of guest artists and tracks like "Hit Them Up" and "Brown Paper Bag" that he credited for being "big, dumb pleasures, just begging to blast from your SUV." AllMusic editor David Jeffries also praised the album for collecting a lot of capable guest artists to deliver great lyricism but found some of Khaled's catchphrases and geographical jumping through his producers as the album's shortcomings, concluding that, "Much more frustrating than a failure, We the Best earns a slight thumbs up if you think of it as a disjointed soundtrack or four-hit mixtape."

Andres Tardio of HipHopDX commented on the various tracks throughout the album, saying that some of them can grab the attention of the listeners but others will feel tiring with the overabundance of guest artists and their lack of focus in the lyrics. Pitchfork contributor Tom Breihan said that after the first single, the album starts to sound rote and generic with tracks that deliver more swagger-rap and less thought-provoking substance, concluding that "We the Best, it turns out, is indicative of one of the major problems with mainstream rap lately: too many rappers seem unwilling to drop their defenses and speak plainly." Nathan Slavik of DJBooth gave credit to the first two singles for having great production and solid artists performing on them but felt the rest of the track listing can get overbloated, saying "We the Best will hit at the charts, but as soon as the next major release comes around it will be forgotten."

Commercial performance
The album debuted at number 8 on the US Billboard 200, selling 79,000 copies in its first week. As of January 2008, the album has sold 440,000 copies in the United States.

Track listing

Notes
On the Wal-Mart edition, the track "Hit 'Em Up" was being removed from the track listing on the album.
"Intro (We the Best)" and "**** I'm from Dade County" both do not included the vocals from Rick Ross in some markets, only included on the Best Buy edition.
Tracks "187" and "Hit 'Em Up" are not included in the digital version.

Sample credits
"We Takin' Over" contains a sample of "C.R.E.A.M." performed by Wu-Tang Clan.
"Brown Paper Bag" contains a sample of "If I Can't Have You" performed by Yvonne Elliman.
"S" on My Chest" contains a sample of "Get Your Shine On" performed by Birdman.

Personnel
Credits for We the Best adapted from AllMusic.

 Robert "Big Briz" Brisbane – engineer
 Ryan Deaunovich – mixing assistant
 Luis Diaz – mixing
 Ben Diehl – assistant engineer, mixing assistant
 Jeff Edwards – engineer
 John Franck – video producer
 Abel Garibaldi – engineer, programming
 Paul Grosso – creative director
 Thomas "T" Hatcher – bass guitar
 Terrell Jones – stylist

 Andrew Kelley – art direction, design
 Ian Mereness – Pro Tools
 Eddie Montilla – piano
 Regena Ratcliffe – print production
 Leroy Barbie Romans – keyboards
 Douglas Sadler – producer
 Paul Alfonso - SEIR
 Gina Victoria – assistant engineer

Charts

Weekly charts

Year-end charts

References

2007 albums
DJ Khaled albums
E1 Music albums
Albums produced by Jim Jonsin
Albums produced by Danja (record producer)
Albums produced by Cool & Dre
Albums produced by Kane Beatz
Albums produced by the Runners
Albums produced by DJ Khaled